The Town of St Arnaud was a local government area about  northwest of Melbourne, the state capital of Victoria, Australia. Its area was surrounded by the Shire of Kara Kara.

History

St Arnaud was first incorporated as a municipal district on 16 August 1861. It became a borough on 1 October 1863, and a town on 17 October 1950.

On 20 January 1995, the Town of St Arnaud was abolished, and along with the City of Stawell and parts of the Shires of Ararat, Avoca, Donald, Dunmunkle, Kara Kara, Stawell and the Grampians National Park section of the Shire of Wimmera, was merged into the newly created Shire of Northern Grampians.

Wards
The Town of St Arnaud was not subdivided into wards, and the nine councillors represented the entire area.

Population

* Estimate in the 1958 Victorian Year Book.

References

External links
 Victorian Places - St Arnaud

Saint Arnaud Town
1861 establishments in Australia